James P. Kushner is an American hematologist, currently Distinguished Professor Emeritus at University of Utah.

References

Year of birth missing (living people)
Living people
University of Utah faculty
American hematologists
Place of birth missing (living people)